The hafnium controversy is a debate over the possibility of 'triggering' rapid energy releases, via gamma ray emission, from a nuclear isomer of hafnium, 178m2Hf. The energy release is potentially 5 orders of magnitude (100,000 times) more energetic than a chemical reaction, but 2 orders of magnitude less than a nuclear fission reaction. In 1998, a group led by Carl Collins of the University of Texas at Dallas reported having successfully initiated such a trigger. Signal-to-noise ratios were small in those first experiments, and to date no other group has been able to duplicate these results. Peter Zimmerman described claims of weaponization potential as having been based on "very bad science".

Background

178m2Hf is a particularly attractive candidate for induced gamma emission (IGE) experiments, because of its high density of stored energy, 2.5 MeV per nucleus, and long 31-year half life for storing that energy. If radiation from some agent could "trigger" a release of that stored energy, the resulting cascade of gamma photons would have the best chance of finding a pair of excited states with the inverted lifetimes needed for stimulated emission. While induced emission adds only power to a radiation field, stimulated emission adds coherence.

This process can help create extremely efficient nuclear reaction engines, along with more precise radiometric devices.
A proposal to show the efficacy for "triggering" 178m2Hf was approved by a NATO-Advanced Research Workshop (NATO-ARW) held in Predeal in 1995. Although the proposal was to use incident protons to bombard the target, α-particles were available when the first experiment was scheduled. It was done by a French, Russian, Romanian and American team. Results were said  to be extraordinary, but the results were not published. Nevertheless, 178m2Hf was implied to be of special importance to potential applications of IGE. A controversy quickly erupted.

Importance 
178m2Hf has the highest excitation energy of any comparably long-lived isomer. One gram of pure 178m2Hf contains approximately 1330 megajoules of energy, the equivalent in about 300 kilograms (660 pounds) of the explosive TNT. The activity is in a cascade of penetrating gamma rays, the most energetic of which is 0.574 MeV. Substantial shielding would be needed for human safety if the sample were to be one gram of the pure isomer. However, so far the nuclear isomer exists only at low concentrations (<0.1%), within multi-isotopic hafnium. 
All energy released would be in the form of photons; X-rays and gamma rays.
If all the energy in the nucleus could be released within a short time (e.g., one nanosecond), one gram of pure 178m2Hf would produce an x-ray burst with extremely high power on the order of 1 GJ/ns or 1 exawatt (1 x 1018 W). However, quantitative estimates indicate that the energy released by the nuclear isomer is much less than the energy needed to initiate the process; the power needed to initiate IGE would have to occur over a shorter time scale than the release of the nuclear energy, and would therefore be even more extremely disproportionate.
The characteristic scales of times for processes involved in applications would be favorable for consuming all of the initial radioactivity. The process for triggering a sample by IGE would use photons to trigger and produce photons as a product. The propagation of photons occurs at the speed of light while mechanical disassembly of the target would proceed with a velocity comparable to that of sound. Untriggered 178m2Hf material might not be able to get away from a triggered event if the photons did not interact first with the electrons. 
Both the proposal to the NATO-ARW and the fragmentary results from the subsequent experiment indicated that the energy of the photon needed to initiate IGE from 178m2Hf would be less than 300 keV. Many economical sources of such low energy X-rays were available for delivering quite large fluxes to target samples of modest dimensions.
Samples of 178m2Hf were and remain available at low concentrations (<0.1%).

Chronology of notable events 
Around 1997, the JASONS advisory group took testimony about the triggering of nuclear isomers. The JASON Defense Advisory Group published a relevant public report saying that they concluded that such a thing would be impossible and should not be attempted. Despite intervening publications in peer-reviewed journals of articles written by an international team reporting IGE from 178m2Hf, around 2003 IDA took testimony, again from relevant scientists on matters of the credibility of reported results. Professor Carl Collins, the lead U.S. member of the team publishing the successes, did not testify.

Around 2003, DARPA initiated exploratory research termed stimulated isomer energy release (SIER) and public interest was aroused, at both popular levels and at professional levels.

The first focus of SIER was whether significant amounts of 178m2Hf could be produced at acceptable costs for possible applications. A closed panel called HIPP was charged with the task and concluded that it could. However, a scientist on that confidential DARPA HIPP review panel "leaked" prejudicial but preliminary concerns to the press. This unsubstantiated assertion set into motion the subsequent cascade of inaccurate reports about the so-called "outrageous costs" of isomer triggering.
Having satisfied the charge to the HIPP panel to explore the problem of production at acceptable cost, the SIER program turned to the matter of definitive confirmation of the reports of IGE from 178m2Hf. A task of TRiggering Isomer Proof (TRIP) was mandated by DARPA and assigned to a completely independent team from those reporting success previously. The "gold standard" of hafnium-isomer triggering was set as the Rusu dissertation. The TRIP experiment required independent confirmation of the Rusu dissertation. It was successful, but could not be published.
By 2006, the Collins team had published multiple papers supporting their initial observations of IGE from 178m2Hf. Reprints (available at the link) of articles that were published after 2001 describe work conducted with tunable monochromatic X-ray beams from the synchrotron light sources SPring-8 in Hyogo and SLS in Villigen.
By 2006, there were 2 articles that claimed to disprove possibilities for IGE from 178m2Hf and three theoretical articles written by the same individual saying why it should not be possible to occur by the particular steps the author envisioned. The first two described synchrotron experiments in which the X-rays were not monochromatic.
In 2007, Pereira et al. estimated that the cost of the electrical energy to store energy in the nuclear isomer is on the order of $1/J; building and maintaining the particle accelerator needed for the purpose is extra. Any reasonable explosive device, e.g., a hand grenade, may contain from 10 to 100 g of TNT, corresponding to 40 to 400 kJ, at a cost of tens of dollars or at least 10,000 times less than this estimate for isomeric energy content in the nucleus. Such an excessive cost makes any device based on nuclear isomers much too expensive to be practical, and research motivated by potential applications thereof a waste of money (in contrast to research on nuclear isomers purely for scientific purposes that do not claim any practicality).    
On February 29, 2008, DARPA distributed some of the 150 copies of the final report of the TRIP experiment that had independently confirmed the "gold standard" of hafnium-isomer triggering. Sustained by peer review, the 94-page report is distributed for official use only (FOUO) by the DARPA Technical Information Office, 3701 N. Fairfax Dr., Arlington, VA 22203 USA.
On October 9, 2008, LLNL released the 110-page evaluation of the DARPA TRIP experiment. Quoting from page 33, "Overall, the X-ray 178m2Hf experiments by Collins et al. are statistically marginal and inconsistent. None of the reported positive triggering results were confirmed by independent groups, including those experiments performed by former collaborators (Carroll). " In addition, the report summary states, page 65: "Our conclusion is that the utilization of nuclear isomers for energy storage is impractical from the points of view of nuclear structure, nuclear reactions, and of prospects for controlled energy release. We note that the cost of producing the nuclear isomer is likely to be extraordinarily high, and that the technologies that would be required to perform the task are beyond anything done before and are difficult to cost at this time."
In 2009, S.A. Karamian et al. published the results of a four-nation team's experimental measurements at Dubna for the production of quantities of 178m2Hf by spallation at energies as low as 80 MeV. In addition to significantly lowering the projected cost of production, this experimental result proved the accessibility to sources of 178m2Hf to be within the capabilities of the several idle cyclotron devices scattered around the world.

References 

Also note:

 

Nuclear interdisciplinary topics
Hafnium
Fringe physics
Proposed weapons